Griffith Rutherford (c. 1721–1805) was a North Carolina Militia brigadier general in the American Revolutionary War. General Rutherford may also refer to:

Andrew Rutherford, 1st Earl of Teviot (died 1664), Scottish-born French Army lieutenant general (rank disputed)
Donald L. Rutherford (born 1955), U.S. Army major general
Jerry R. Rutherford (fl. 1960s–1990s), U.S. Army lieutenant general
Robert L. Rutherford (1938–2013), U.S. Air Force general

See also
David Rutherford-Jones (born 1958), British Army major general